Eupithecia aysenae is a moth in the family Geometridae. It is found in the Region of Campo (Coyhaique Province) in Chile. The habitat consists of the Aysen Cordillera Biotic Province.

The length of the forewings is about 9.5 mm for females. The forewings are pale greyish brown, with slender, irregular cross lines on most of wing. The hindwings are slightly greyer than the forewings, with some pale grey scaling along the inner margin and becoming
slightly darker distally. Adults have been recorded on wing in January.

Etymology
The specific name is based on the type locality.

References

Moths described in 1987
aysenae
Moths of South America
Endemic fauna of Chile